Dataphyte is a media, research, and data analytics organisation operating as an access to information for development program and as an end-to-end data-as-a-service platform offering data services. Dataphyte uses data science and artificial intelligence tools to gather, curate, store and offer data on diverse subjects including government policy, economy, market trends, health, education, security, election, climate and in extractive industry. Dataphyte transforms generated data into machine-readable formats, generates interactive visualisations, analyse and publish insights into the data making it an open data source for journalists, civil society organisations and researchers.

History 

Dataphyte was founded in 2019 by Joshua Olufemi, a Nigerian media and civic technology innovator. Dataphyte's work has been funded by the Open Society Initiative for West Africa, National Endowment for Democracy,  the Media Development Investment Fund, and the BigLocal news Project at Stanford University.

References 

Publications established in 2019
Mass media companies of Nigeria
2019 establishments in Nigeria